Lourdes Domínguez Lino and Arantxa Parra Santonja were the defending champions, but lost in the first round to Nuria Llagostera Vives and María José Martínez Sánchez.

Seeds

Draw

Finals

External links
 Draw

Doubles